Bibi Pak Daman is the mausoleum of Ruqayyah bint Ali located in Lahore, Punjab, Pakistan. Legend has it that it holds the graves of six ladies from Muhammad's household (Ahl Al-Bayt). Ruqayyah bint Ali ibn Abu Talib was the daughter of Muhammad's cousin and son-in-law Ali ibn Abu Talib. Ruqayah bint Ali was the sister of Al-Abbas ibn Ali and also the wife of Muslim ibn Aqeel (emissary of third Shi'a Imam Husayn ibn Ali to Kufah). Others are said to be Muslim ibn Aqil's sister and daughters. It is said that these ladies came here after the event of the battle of Karbala on the 10th day of the month of Muharram in 61 AH (October 10, AD 680). Bibi Pak Daman, which means the "chaste lady", is the collective name of the six ladies believed to interred at this mausoleum, though it is also (mistakenly) popularly used to refer to the personage of Ruqayyah bint Ali alone. They were among the women who brought Islam to South Asia, preaching and engaging in missionary activity in the environs of Lahore.

Some scholars consider Ruqayah to have been the daughter of Sayid Ahmed Tokhta (12th century). Bibi Paak Daaman is located between Garhi Shahu and Railway Station area. The easiest way to go to Bibi Paak Daaman is from the Empress Road and from there, take the small road opposite Police Lines and then the first left-turn. Recently Government of Pakistan is considering approval of the expansion of the Bibi Pak Daman's shrine.

Life
After the events at Karbala five Muslim women, led by Ruqayyah bint Ali left Mecca to settle and proselytize in Lahore, as a result of which a sizable portion of the Hindu community entered Islam.

According to one school of thought among historians such as S.M. Latif, Molvi Noor Ahmad Chishti and Mufti Ghulam Server the daughters of Ali were instructed by their father to go to Sind and Hind to preach the Islamic faith. It was prophesied that their mission would achieve success. The events of the massacre at Karbala caused many relatives of Muhammad including Ruqayyah to migrate to Makran where she preached Islam for several years. The Hindu Raja of Jaisalmer felt threatened by her missionary work. Umayyad rulers were also displeased and a number of Umayyad spies were dispatched to assassinate her. Among such potential assassins had been Muhammad Bin Qasim who later switched allegiances and became a supporter of Ruqayyah after learning of the sufferings experienced by the family of Muhammad.

However, continued threats to Ruqayyah's life caused her to cross the Indus River to settle in Lahore. The local Hindu ruler there attempted to arrest her but this failed when his son, the prince Bakrama Sahi, accepted Islam and became impressed with Ruqayyah's work. This enabled Ruqayyah to continue her missionary activities in peace for some more time. Eventually, fearing disgrace at the hands of the Hindu Raja's army when they were again dispatched to arrest her and the other five ladies, she gathered her female kin and made a collective prayer for rescue. As a fulfillment of their wishes, the ground split and their camp went underground. A shawl remained to mark the spot of that event.

Another school of thought among historians, including Kanhya Lal, Muhammad Aslam and Tanveer Anjum, argue that there was no reason for these Muslim women to settle in the Hindu-ruled Lahore.

Names in history
Seven ladies and four men are traceable from history, as it is found that she introduced herself stating that “ I am widow of Martyr Muslim bin Aqeel, daughter of Ali and sister of commander-in-chief Abbas of Imam Hussain's Army and other five ladies were my sisters in law, whereas the sixth one was our maid “Halima” but she was equal to us in status.  She introduced further telling the names of men that they were our guards and belonged to our tribes namely (i) Abb-ul-Fatah (ii) Abb-ul-Fazal (iii) Abb-ul-Mukaram, and (iv) Abdullah.

The name of first Mujawir (one who looks after the grave and cares for visitors) was Baba Khaki.  Besides two names “ Ruqaya and Halima”   Dr. Masood Raza Khaki,  the then Deputy Director General in the Education Department (1977), Government of Punjab,   traces the five names  from historical records as:
(1)Umm-e-Hani (2)Umm-e-Luqman (3) Asma (4)Ramla (5)Zainab
Historically, the first proper Khanqah  was constructed by  Malik Ayaz in the period of 11th Century and reconstructed in the regime of Akbar the great.

Historical Misconceptions
There is a very famous misconception in indian subcontinent regarding Syeda Ruqayyah bint Ali which states that This Holy lady is the Daughter of Umm ul-Banin and full sister of Abbas ibn Ali. Which in reality is a misconception as Umm ul-Banin (Meaning Mother of several sons) had no daughter.

Urs Sharif/Death Anniversary 
The shrine is visited by both Shias and Sunnis. In the Islamic month of Jumada al-Thani three days urs of Bibi Pak Daman from 7 to 9 is celebrated. The urs proceedings are mostly a Sunni affair while Shias visit the shrine most commonly during Muharram and Safar. Many Shias also visit during the urs.   The street and shrine area remain filled with devotees all the day from all over Pakistan. On the eve of Urs, the shrine is even more crowded. People from across the subcontinent, mainly from Provinces of Punjab and Sindh, come to the shrine to pay their homage and make a wish which they believe more likely would come true. A narrow lane that leads to the shrine has shops on both sides containing Muharram-related items. Imam Ali, Imam Hassan, Imam Hussain and literature on the history of Karbala, Khak-e-Shifa (soil of Karbla) and CDs of Nohas (elegies) are available at the shops. A reverence event of urs includes a ritual in which women devotees bring water for ablution of the graves at the shrine of Bibi. The Tourism Development Corporation of Punjab Limited (TDCP), Government of Punjab has placed this shrine in the list of some popular shrines for the tourists.

Gallery

See also
List of mausolea
Shahr Banu (for similarity to shrine at Lahore and Ray)

References

External links

Future Project in Lahore (Pakistan) with a documentary clip
WikiShia: Ruqayya bt. al-Imam 'Ali (a)

Shrines in Lahore
Sufi shrines in Pakistan
Ziyarat
Mausoleums in Punjab, Pakistan
Shrines in Pakistan